Fred Goebel (3 April 1891 – 16 May 1964) was a German film actor. He was born as Walter Goebel and was sometimes credited as Fred Selva-Goebel.

Selected filmography
 Child on the Open Road (1919)
 The Dance of Death (1919)
 Bettler GmbH (1919)
 Monte Carlo (1921)
 Deceiver of the People (1921)
 The Woman in the Trunk (1921)
 Insulted and Humiliated (1922)
 Between Evening and Morning (1923)
 The Wig (1925)
 Lace (1926)
 1914 (1931)
 The Captain from Köpenick (1931)
 Trenck (1932)
 Marshal Forwards (1932)
 Gretel Wins First Prize (1933)
 Count Woronzeff (1934)
 Make Me Happy (1935)
 Scandal at the Fledermaus (1936)
 Lucky Kids (1936)
 Talking About Jacqueline (1937)
 Ball at the Metropol (1937)
 When Women Keep Silent (1937)
 The Glass Ball (1937)
 Sergeant Berry (1938)
 The Impossible Mister Pitt (1938)
 Secret Code LB 17 (1938)
 Napoleon Is to Blame for Everything (1938)
 The Indian Tomb (1938)
 Twelve Minutes After Midnight (1939)
 The Governor (1939)
 In the Name of the People (1939)
 Robert and Bertram (1939)
 The Merciful Lie (1939)
 Enemies (1940)
 Counterfeiters (1940)
 Carl Peters (1941)
 Attack on Baku (1942)
 Back Then (1943)

Bibliography
 Hardt, Ursula. From Caligari to California: Erich Pommer's Life in the International Film Wars. Berghahn Books, 1996.
 Rentschler, Eric. The Ministry of Illusion: Nazi Cinema and Its Afterlife. Harvard University Press, 1996.

External links

1891 births
1964 deaths
German male film actors
German male silent film actors
Male actors from Berlin
20th-century German male actors